Marlangki Suting (born 1986) is an Indian football player. He is currently playing for Royal Wahingdoh F.C. in the I-League as a defender.

References

External links
 http://goal.com/en-india/people/india/27044/marlangki-suting
 http://www.indianfootball.com/en/statistic/player/detail/playerId/669

Indian footballers
1986 births
Living people
People from Shillong
Footballers from Meghalaya
Shillong Lajong FC players
Royal Wahingdoh FC players
NorthEast United FC players
Association football defenders
I-League players
Indian Super League players